There are multiple transmitters called Koblenz transmitter:

Koblenz radio transmitter, a historic mediumwave transmitter
Fernmeldeturm Koblenz
Transmitter Dieblich-Naßheck, commonly called Koblenz transmitter